The 1985 Big Ten Conference football season was the 90th season of college football played by the member schools of the Big Ten Conference and was a part of the 1985 NCAA Division I-A football season.

The 1985 Big Ten champion was the 1985 Iowa Hawkeyes football team. The Hawkeyes began the season 7-0 and rose to the No. 1 ranking, including a 12–10 win over No. 2 Michigan at Kinnick Stadium, before losing to Ohio State. Iowa entered the Rose Bowl at 10–1 with an outside shot at a national championship, but were upset by UCLA in the 1986 Rose Bowl, 45–28. Iowa quarterback Chuck Long received the Chicago Tribune Silver Football trophy as the conference's most valuable player.  Long and linebacker Larry Station were consensus first-team All-Americans.

The 1985 Michigan Wolverines football team finished in second place in the Big Ten, compiled a 10–1–1 record, defeated Nebraska in the 1986 Fiesta Bowl, and was ranked No. 2 in the final AP and Coaches Polls. Quarterback Jim Harbaugh set a school record with 1,976 passing yards, and Jamie Morris rushed for 1,030 yards.  Led by consensus first-team All-Americans Mike Hammerstein at defensive tackle and Brad Cochran at cornerback, the defense tallied three shutouts, gave up only 75 points in 11 regular season games (6.8 points per game), and led the nation in scoring defense. Bo Schembechler was selected as Big Ten Coach of the Year.

The 1985 Ohio State Buckeyes football team compiled a 9–3 record, defeated BYU in the 1985 Florida Citrus Bowl, and was ranked No. 11 in the final Coaches Poll. Linebackers Chris Spielman and Pepper Johnson both received first-team All-American honors. Wide receiver Cris Carter had 950 receiving yards and received first-team All-Big Ten honors.

Running back Lorenzo White of Michigan State led the conference in both rushing (2,066 yards) and scoring (102 points) and was a consensus first-team All-American. Wide receiver David Williams of Illinois was also a consensus first-team All-American.

Season overview

Results and team statistics

Key
AP final = Team's rank in the final AP Poll of the 1985 season
AP high = Team's highest rank in the AP Poll throughout the 1985 season
PPG = Average of points scored per game; conference leader's average displayed in bold
PAG = Average of points allowed per game; conference leader's average displayed in bold
MVP = Most valuable player as voted by players on each team as part of the voting process to determine the winner of the Chicago Tribune Silver Football trophy; trophy winner in bold

Pre-season

Regular season

Bowl games
Six Big Ten teams played in bowl games:
 Iowa lost to UCLA, 45–28, in the 1986 Rose Bowl in Pasadena, California.
 Michigan defeated Nebraska, 27–23, in the 1986 Fiesta Bowl in Tempe, Arizona.
 Michigan State lost to Georgia Tech, 17–14, in the 1985 Hall of Fame Classic in Birmingham, Alabama.
 Illinois lost to Army, 31–29, in the 1985 Peach Bowl in Atlanta, Georgia.
 Ohio State defeated BYU, 10–7, in the 1985 Florida Citrus Bowl in Orlando, Florida.
 Minnesota defeated Clemson, 20–13, in the 1985 Independence Bowl, in Shreveport, Louisiana.

Rankings

Statistical leaders
The Big Ten's individual statistical leaders include the following:

Passing yards 
1. Jim Everett, Purdue (3,651)
2. Chuck Long, Iowa (2,978)
3. Jack Trudeau, Illinois (2,938)
4. Jim Karsatos, Ohio State (2,311)
5. Mike Greenfield, Northwestern (2,152)

Rushing yards
1. Lorenzo White, Michigan State (2,066)
2. Larry Emery, Wisconsin (1,113)
3. Ronnie Harmon, Iowa (1,111)
4. Jamie Morris, Michigan (1,030)
5. Bobby Howard, Indiana (967)

Receiving yards
1. Rodney Carter, Purdue (1,099)
2. David Williams, Illinois (1,047)
3. Cris Carter, Ohio State (950)
4. Kenny Allen, Indiana (929)
5. Bill Happel, Iowa (812)

Total offense
1. Jim Everett, Purdue (3,589)
2. Jack Trudeau, Illinois	(2,914)
3. Chuck Long, Iowa (2,887)
4. Jim Karsatos, Ohio State (2,350)
5. Mike Greenfield, Northwestern (2,222)

Passing efficiency rating
1. Jim Harbaugh, Michigan (157.9)
2. Chuck Long, Iowa (153.0)
3. Jim Karsatos, Ohio State (144.6)
4. Jim Everett, Purdue (143.5)
5. Jack Trudeau, Illinois (123.4)

Rushing yards per attempt
1. Joe Armentrout, Wisconsin (6.4)
2. Valdez Baylor, Minnesota (5.9)
3. Thomas Rooks, Illinois (5.4)
4. Ronnie Harmon, Iowa (5.3)
5. Jamie Morris, Michigan (5.2)

Yards per reception
1. Mark Ingram Sr., Michigan State (21.9)
2. Tim Fullington, Wisconsin (19.2)
3. Paul Jokisch, Michigan (18.4)
4. Mike Lanese, Ohio State (17.8)
5. Mark Jackson, Purdue (17.0)

Points scored
1. Lorenzo White, Michigan State (102)
2. Rob Houghtlin, Iowa (97)
3. Mike Gillette, Michigan (78)
4. Rich Spangler, Ohio State (77)
5. Chris White, Illinois (73)

Awards and honors

All-conference players

The following players were picked by the Associated Press (AP) and/or the United Press International (UPI) as first-team players on the 1985 All-Big Ten Conference football team.

Offense

Defense

Special teams

All-Americans

At the end of the season, five Big Ten players were consensus first-team picks for the 1985 College Football All-America Team. The Big Ten's consensus All-Americans were:

Other Big Ten players who were named first-team All-Americans by at least one selector were:

Other awards
Three Big Ten players finished among the top six in voting for the Heisman Trophy: Iowa quarterback Chuck Long (second, trailing Bo Jackson by one percent); Michigan State running back Lorenzo White (fourth); and Purdue quarterback Jim Everett (sixth).

Chuck Long and Lorenzo White tied for the Big Ten Player of the Year award. Long received the Chicago Tribune Silver Football award.

Bo Schembechler of Michigan received the Big Ten Coach of the Year award.

1986 NFL draft
The 1986 NFL Draft was held April 29–30, 1986.  The following Big Ten players were selected in the first round of the draft:

References